Sir Harry St. George Ord  (17 June 1819 – 20 August 1885) was a British colonial administrator who served as Governor of Bermuda between 1861 and 1864, Governor of the Straits Settlements between 1867 and 1873, and Governor of Western Australia between 1877 and 1880.

Education and career
Ord was the son of Henry Gough Ord and grandson of Craven Ord (1756–1832) of Greenstead Hall, Essex, a prominent antiquarian. He was educated at the Royal Military Academy at Woolwich, (1835–1837). He served in the Royal Engineers, (1837–1856), principally in the West Indies, West Africa, and the Anglo-French expedition to the Baltic (1854), during the Crimean War.

Ord later held many important colonial posts, including:
 Commissioner of the Gold Coast (1855–1856)
 Commissioner at the Courts of Paris and The Hague (1856–1857)
 Governor of Dominica (1857–1861)
 Governor of Bermuda (1861–1864)
 Special Commissioner to West Africa (1864–1867)
 Governor of the Straits Settlements (1867–1873)
 Governor of Western Australia (1877–1880)

Governor of Straits Settlements

Sir Harry Ord, whom the second Colonial Office appointed in 1867 as the Governor of the Straits Settlements, was at first given no instructions regarding the Colony's relations with the Malay States. He was unpopular in the Straits Settlements, but was an ambitious and energetic man, who was ready to do what he could to restore order and promote trade in the Peninsula. Conditions in Malaya at that time were extremely unsettled. The quarrels of the Malays were intensified by feuds between competing groups of Chinese miners, and the links of the Chinese with the British settlements threatened to involve these too in the trouble. After some experience of negotiating with Malays and Siamese, Ord worked out a policy under which he proposed to share the supervision of the Peninsula between Britain and Siam. This policy was disapproved by the Colonial Office, and Ord was directed to abstain from all interference in the affairs of the Malay States.

Life

Ord married Julia Graham of Exmouth daughter of Admiral James Carpenterin on 28 June 1846 by whom he had three sons. Sir Harry Ord died on 20 August 1885 from heart attack and was buried in the churchyard of St. Martin's parish church in Fornham St. Martin, Suffolk, England. The village institute in Fornham was built in Ord's memory with funds donated by the Maharaja of Johore.

The Ord River in the Kimberley region of Western Australia was named in his honour, as was Ord Street, Fremantle.

Awards
K.C.M.G., 1877
G.C.M.G., 1881

References

 Colonial Office List, various list, DNB
 One Hundred Years of Singapore (1819)
 C.D. Cowan, Nineteenth Century Malaya: The Origins of British Political Control, (1961)

External links
Sir Harry Ord Biography from Australian Dictionary of Biography online
Sir Harry Ord Biography from Constitutional Centre of WA online

See also
 The Petition of Chung Keng Quee & 44 Others to Sir Harry Ord seeking government protection.

1819 births
1885 deaths
Graduates of the Royal Military Academy, Woolwich
Royal Engineers officers
British Army personnel of the Crimean War
Governors of Western Australia
Knights Grand Cross of the Order of St Michael and St George
Companions of the Order of the Bath
Governors of the Straits Settlements
Governors of Dominica
Governors of Bermuda
People from North Cray
British Army generals
Colony of Western Australia people
Administrators in British Singapore